Ocobla Creek is a stream in the U.S. state of Mississippi.

Ocobla is a name derived from the Choctaw language purported to mean either (sources vary) "water where the biting is" or "bulls-eye bush". A variant transliteration is "Ocobly Creek".

References

Rivers of Mississippi
Rivers of Neshoba County, Mississippi
Mississippi placenames of Native American origin